Carlos Fowler (born August 30, 1972) is a former American football lineman who played nine seasons in the Arena Football League with the Texas Terror/Houston ThunderBears, Nashville Kats and Los Angeles Avengers. He also played for the Houston Outlaws in the short-lived Regional Football League in 1999. In the Canadian Football League (CFL), he was a member of the Toronto Argonauts, Hamilton Tiger-Cats and England Monarchs. Fowler played college football at the University of Wisconsin–Madison.

References

External links
Just Sports Stats

Living people
1972 births
Players of American football from Cleveland
American football offensive linemen
American football defensive linemen
Canadian football defensive linemen
African-American players of American football
African-American players of Canadian football
Wisconsin Badgers football players
Toronto Argonauts players
Hamilton Tiger-Cats players
Texas Terror players
London Monarchs players
Houston ThunderBears players
Nashville Kats players
Los Angeles Avengers players
Regional Football League players
Players of Canadian football from Cleveland
21st-century African-American sportspeople
20th-century African-American sportspeople